Steven Perry (born September 7, 1988 in Edmond, Oklahoma) is an American soccer player.

Career
Perry played college soccer at the University of Notre Dame between 2007 and 2010. At college he was named - 2010 First Team All-Big East, 2010 Second Team All-Great lakes Region and was Four-Time Big-East Academic All-Star.

During his time at Notre Dame, Perry also played for USL Premier Development League club Indiana Invaders in 2009 and 2010.

On January 13, 2011 Perry was drafted in the third round (39th overall) of the 2011 MLS SuperDraft by New England Revolution, but was not signed by the club.

Perry played with Finnish third division club Ekenäs IF for their 2011 season.

Perry signed his first fully professional contract with USL Professional Division club Wilmington Hammerheads on March 14, 2012.

References

External links
 Notre Dame profile

1988 births
Living people
American soccer players
American expatriate soccer players
Notre Dame Fighting Irish men's soccer players
Indiana Invaders players
Wilmington Hammerheads FC players
OKC Energy FC players
Expatriate footballers in Finland
USL League Two players
USL Championship players
New England Revolution draft picks
Sportspeople from Oklahoma County, Oklahoma
Ekenäs IF players
Soccer players from Oklahoma
Association football forwards